Maida (also Seven Lakes) is an unincorporated community in northern Cavalier County, North Dakota, United States. It lies along North Dakota Highway 1, north of the city of Langdon, the county seat of Cavalier County.  Its elevation is 1,562 feet (476 m). Maida serves as a port of entry between Canada and the United States.

Various possibilities have been suggested for the etymology of the name "Maida":

A book read by Charles Howatt, the first postmaster
Suggested by two Canadian bankers from a dog in a novel by Sir Walter Scott
A clipping of "maiden" name for a haymeadow

Maida's post office was established in September 1884 and became a Rural Branch of Langdon in April 1967; the community still has its own ZIP code of 58255. The Maida post office has closed.

Maida was an attraction every Wednesday, Friday, and Saturday night, thanks to Jack's Bar; at times the community of just a handful would turn into hundreds. After 46 years in operation Jack's Bar closed in 2010 to make room for a new border crossing. Now the once booming town sits empty with only one resident.

See also
 Maida–Windygates Border Crossing

References

Unincorporated communities in Cavalier County, North Dakota
Unincorporated communities in North Dakota
Populated places established in 1884
1884 establishments in Dakota Territory